Morocco will compete at the 2009 World Championships in Athletics from 15–23 August. A team of 21 athletes was announced in preparation for the competition. Selected athletes have achieved one of the competition's qualifying standards. The squad includes two-time marathon champion Jaouad Gharib, and twice 800 metres silver medallist Hasna Benhassi.

Team selection

Track and road events

Field and combined events

Results

Men
Track and road events

Field events

Women

References

External links
Official competition website

Nations at the 2009 World Championships in Athletics
World Championships in Athletics
Morocco at the World Championships in Athletics